In data processing operational reporting is reporting about operational details that reflects current activity.  Operational reporting is intended to support the day-to-day activities of the organization. "Examples of operational reporting include bank teller end-of-day window balancing reports, daily account audits and adjustments, daily production records, flight-by-flight traveler logs and transaction logs."

See also
 Business reporting
 List of reporting software
 Reporting (disambiguation)

References

Business intelligence
Data processing